Feijão Maravilha was a Brazilian telenovela produced and broadcast by TV Globo. It premiered on 19 March 1979 and ended on 3 August 1979, with a total of 125 episodes. It's the twenty third "novela das sete" to be aired at the timeslot. It is created by  Bráulio Pedroso and directed by Paulo Ubiratan.

Cast

References

External links 
 

1979 telenovelas
Brazilian telenovelas
TV Globo telenovelas
1979 Brazilian television series debuts
1979 Brazilian television series endings
Portuguese-language telenovelas
Television shows set in Rio de Janeiro (city)
Television series set in hotels